Charles Joseph Auriol (13 November 1778, Geneva - 25 May 1834, Satigny) was a Swiss landscape painter.

Biography
He was the son of Pierre-Elisée d’Auriol (1736-1790), a Colonel in the service of the Kingdom of Sardinia, and Anne-Elisabeth Turrettini. He began as a student of Pierre-Louis de La Rive in Bern, then studied with François-André Vincent and Anne Louis Girodet-Trioson in Paris.

After a stay in Rome, he settled in Geneva, in 1810. The following year, he married Anne-Jeanne Marguerite Dunant (c.1790-1847), of Genoa. They had two children; Philippe Élisé Auriol (1814–1866) and Louis Philippe Gustave Auriol (1816–1882). His first exhibit came in 1798, in Geneva, followed by 1812 in Paris and, from 1817 to 1830, in Zürich and Bern.

His works show elements of both classicism and romanticism. Clouds or fog form the backgrounds for many of his paintings. His friend, the artist Wolfgang-Adam Töpffer, gave him the nickname, Nebelmaler (Fog Painter).

Sources
 .
 
 
 Carl Brun (Ed.): Schweizerisches Künstler-Lexikon. Vol.1. Huber & Co., Frauenfeld 1908, pg.63 (Online).

External links 

1778 births
1834 deaths
Swiss landscape painters
Artists from Geneva